Air Marshal Sir John Alexander Baird,  (born 25 July 1937, died 12 November 2020) was a British physician and a retired Royal Air Force medical officer who served as Surgeon-General of the British Armed Forces from 1997 to 2000.

Baird was appointed a Knight Commander of the Order of the British Empire (KBE) in the 1999 Birthday Honours.  He was appointed Commander of the Order of St John (CStJ) in 1997

Honour Ribbons:

: Order of the British Empire (KBE)
: Venerable Order of St John. (CStJ)

References

 

Surgeons-General of the British Armed Forces
Living people
Royal Air Force air marshals
Royal Air Force Medical Service officers
Deputy Lieutenants of Cambridgeshire
Fellows of the Royal Aeronautical Society
Fellows of the Royal College of Physicians of Edinburgh
Knights Commander of the Order of the British Empire
People educated at Merchiston Castle School
1937 births